Kohuiyeh (also Romanized as Kohū’īyeh; also known as Kūheh) is a village in Pariz Rural District, Pariz District, Sirjan County, Kerman Province, Iran. At the 2006 census, its population was 225, in 48 families.

References 

Populated places in Sirjan County